Sons of the Saddle is a 1930 pre-Code American Western film directed by Harry Joe Brown, written by Bennett Cohen and Leslie Mason, and starring Ken Maynard. It was released on August 3, 1930, by Universal Pictures.

Plot
Maynard portrays a ranch foreman who fights a gang of outlaws. He also sings several songs, including "Down the Home Trail with You", which "became a minor hit" as a recording.

Cast 
Ken Maynard as Jim Brandon
Doris Hill as Veronica 'Ronnie' Stavnow
Joseph W. Girard as Martin Stavnow 
Carroll Nye as Harvey
Francis Ford as 'Red' Slade
Harry Todd as 'Pop' Higgins 
Tarzan as Tarzan

Production 
In addition to Brown as director and Cohen and Mason as screenwriters, Fred Allen was the editor, Ted D. McCord was the cinematographer, and Maynard was the producer.

References

External links 
 

1930 films
1930s English-language films
American Western (genre) films
1930 Western (genre) films
Universal Pictures films
Films directed by Harry Joe Brown
American black-and-white films
1930s American films